"Town Called Malice" is a song recorded by British band the Jam from the album The Gift. It debuted at number one on the UK Singles Chart in February 1982.

Overview
The title is a play on words of the 1950 Nevil Shute novel A Town Like Alice, although Paul Weller says he had not read the book at the time. It was a double A-side single release featuring "Precious" as the flip side. A 12" version was also available with a live version of "Town Called Malice" backed by an extended version of "Precious".

Paul Weller has said that it was written about his hometown Woking as a result of his teenage experiences there. The Irish Independent described the song, like "Going Underground", as a "class-war tirade set to a post-punk northern soul groove".

Released as the first single from the album on 29 January 1982, it entered the chart at number one on the UK Singles Chart, staying at the top for three weeks, and preventing "Golden Brown" by the Stranglers from reaching number one. EMI, the Stranglers record company, objected to the sales of both versions of "Town Called Malice" being aggregated, arguing that Jam fans were buying both and thus preventing their band from reaching the top of the chart.

"Town Called Malice" was the band's third number-one single in the UK. It was the band's sole chart entry onto any American chart (although this single and "Start!" both appeared in the low-rungs of the Billboard Dance/Club Play charts) when it hit No. 31 on the Mainstream Rock Tracks chart in 1982.

The song was ranked among the top ten "Tracks of the Year" for 1982 by NME.

In popular culture

"Town Called Malice" has been featured in the following:
 
- The 1985 comedy film, National Lampoon's European Vacation

- The 2000 drama Billy Elliot;

- The 2003 video game, FIFA 2004.

- The 2005 film, The Matador.

- The 2019 superhero movie, Spider-Man: Far From Home.
 
- The third episode of the seventh season of AMC's The Walking Dead, in a montage where Dwight observes daily life in the Sanctuary.

- The 2022 action film Morbius, starting from the intro of the song, until abruptly stopping at the end of the scene; the melody is recognizable, but most lyrics are audibly obscured by dialogue between main characters Milo and Dr. Michael Morbius.

- The first episode of the 2023 series A Town Called Malice, named after the song, which features the music video during the end credits.

Charts

Weekly charts

Year-end charts

Certifications

References

External links
Lyrics to "Town Called Malice"
Guitar tabs to "Town Called Malice"
Lyrics to "Precious"

1981 songs
1982 singles
The Jam songs
UK Singles Chart number-one singles
Songs written by Paul Weller
Polydor Records singles
British soul songs
Northern soul songs